Nermin Bezmen (born 30 April 1954) is a Turkish novelist.

Biography
Bezmen was born in Antalya in 1954. She attended Macka Primary School. While studying at Atatürk Girls' High School, she went to the United States with AFS scholarship in her senior year. She attended Sultanahmet School of Management and Management on her return and graduated in 1974. In January 1975, she married Pamir Bezmen, a 39-year-old businessman at the age of 21. They had two children. He died on 29 January 2009. In 2015, she married actor Tolga Savacı and settled in New Jersey, USA.

Bezmen conducted television presentation, magazine authorship and public relations activities; She is interested in traditional Turkish arts. She taught painting lessons to adults and children in her own workshop.

She started writing novels in 1991. She researched the story of Kurt Seyt, who was her maternal grandfather, and turned it into a novel. Apart from that, she wrote many popular books in popular literature.

Bibliography  
Kurt Seyt & Shura, 1992, Yay Ofset, İstanbul, (Yeni basımı PMR Yayınları).
Kurt Seyt & Murka, 1994, Yay Ofset, İstanbul, (Yeni basımı PMR Yayınları).
Sır, 2006, İstanbul, Remzi Kitabevi.
Aurora'nın İncileri, 2007, İstanbul, Remzi Kitabevi.
Sırça Tuzak, 2007, İstanbul, Remzi Kitabevi.
Mengene Göçmenleri, 1996, İstanbul, PMR Yayınları.
Zihnimin Kanatları, 1995, İstanbul, PMR Yayınları.
Bizim Gizli Bahçemizden, 2009, İstanbul, Doğan Kitapçılık.
Kırk Kırık Küp (Hikâye), 1999, İstanbul, PMR Yayınları.
Bir Gece Yolculuğu, 1999, İstanbul, PMR Yayınları,
Bir Duayen'in Hatıratı: Fuad Bezmen, 2002, (Nermin Bezmen) PMR Yayınları; Anılar (Hatırat); İstanbul, PMR Yayınları.
Turkuaz'a Dönüş Bilge Nadir-Nevzat'ın Anılarından Asil Nadir Gerçeği, (Nermin Bezmen, Tercüme: Pamir Bezmen), 1997, İstanbul, PMR Yayınları.
 Dedem Kurt Seyit ve Ben, 2014, Destek Yayınları 
 Gönderilmeyen Aşk, 2010, Doğan Kitapçılık

References

1954 births
Living people
People from Antalya
Turkish women novelists
Turkish people of Crimean Tatar descent
20th-century Turkish women writers
20th-century Turkish writers
21st-century Turkish women writers